Night Life of the Gods (also known as Thorne Smith's Night Life of the Gods) is a 1935 American fantasy film released by Universal Pictures. Based on a 1931 novel by Thorne Smith, the film was directed by Lowell Sherman and starred Alan Mowbray as a scientist who devises a ray that can turn people to stone and bring statues to life.

For many years believed to be a lost film, a 35mm print surfaced in the 1980s in a donation to the UCLA Film and Television Archive.

Synopsis
Eccentric scientist Hunter Hawk (Alan Mowbray) nearly blows himself up during an experiment. When he comes to, he finds that he is successful at last: he has created a ring that can turn living creatures into statues as well as bring statues to life. After testing the device on his dog, he makes statues of his disagreeable family; only his favorite niece, Daphne (Peggy Shannon), is spared. Hawk and Daphne celebrate the petrification of their relatives with a bottle of wine after which Daphne goes off to meet her boyfriend Cyril (Douglas Fowley). Hawk takes a drunken stroll through the cornfield where he encounters the gardener, Old Man Turner (Ferdinand Gottschalk), who turns out to be a leprechaun. Turner takes Hawk home to meet his daughter, Meg (Florine McKinney), and the two hit it off. They embark on a spree, turning other disagreeable people into statues left and right. At the Metropolitan Museum of Art, Hawk brings statues of Greek gods to life. Hawk and Meg take the gods on a whirlwind tour of the modern world embodied by Manhattan resulting in more mayhem, the disillusionment of the gods, and Hawk's eventual weariness with what he has wrought. Since he and Meg wish to be together, and concluding that he is certain to be locked up as a madman, he turns the ring on Meg and himself. Hawk then awakens in an ambulance and discovers that the entire evening was the result of head injuries sustained in the explosion at the beginning of the story.

Cast

Alan Mowbray as Hunter Hawk
Florine McKinney as "Meg" Turner
Peggy Shannon as Daphne Lambert
Richard Carle as Grandpa Lambert
Teresa Maxwell-Conover as Alice Lambert
Phillips Smalley as Alfred Lambert
Wesley Barry as Alfred Jr.
Gilbert Emery as Betts
Ferdinand Gottschalk as Old Man Turner
Douglas Fowley as Cyril Sparks
William "Stage" Boyd as Mulligan
Henry Armetta as Roigi
Alene Carroll as Stella
Raymond Benard as Apollo
George Hassell as Bacchus
Irene Ware as Diana
Geneva Mitchell as Hebe
Paul Kaye as Mercury
Robert Warwick as Neptune
Pat De Cicco as Perseus
Marda Deering as Venus

Production
In March 1934 Carl Laemmle, Jr. purchased the rights to Thorne Smith's popular 1931 humorous fantasy The Night Life of the Gods. While the plot remained essentially the same, the sexual humor was vitiated by Code considerations. The ending, too, was changed by adding the "it was only a dream" device.

At first, Lowell Sherman himself was considered for the lead role, but he suffered from laryngitis and lost his voice. Also considered for the role of Hunter Hawk was Edward Everett Horton, but Mowbray was signed in July. A well-known character actor throughout his career, this was one of Mowbray's few leading roles. Among the actors portraying gods, "Crash" Corrigan appears as Apollo (credited as Raymond Benard). Pat DiCicco made his only known screen appearance as Perseus (credited as Pat De Cicco); DiCicco was better known as a powerful Hollywood agent and for his brief, troubled marriage to Thelma Todd.

Filming took place between August 13 and October 15, 1934.

Lowell Sherman became ill while shooting Night Life of the Gods and it would be his last finished work; he died of double-pneumonia in December 1934, just days into directing Becky Sharp.

Release
The film was released nationally March 11, 1935. In general it received mixed reviews, some critics finding it funny in parts but drawing an unfavorable comparison to the popular novel. New York Times critic Andre Sennwald found it only "moderately entertaining", but noted that the production was at a disadvantage because of the "current cinema morality". Other critics observed that fans of farcical comedy would be entertained, such as Photoplay brief review that commented, "If you are the type who has tried to take a cow home in an elevator ... this is your picture."

Notes

References

External links

1930s fantasy films
American black-and-white films
Films directed by Lowell Sherman
Universal Pictures films
American fantasy films
1930s rediscovered films
Rediscovered American films
1930s American films